Below is a list of top scorer Indonesia Super League in the 2011-12 season. Last season Boaz Solossa (Persipura Jayapura) won the top scorer in the Indonesia Super League by scoring 22 goals.

Goal-scorers
Including matches played on 11 July 2012.

25 goals
 Alberto Gonçalves (Persipura Jayapura)

22 goals
 Mario Costas (Persela Lamongan)
 Keith Gumbs (Sriwijaya)

20 goals
 Greg Nwokolo (Pelita Jaya)
 Safee Sali (Pelita Jaya)

19 goals
 Boakay Eddie Foday (Persiwa Wamena)
 Osas Marvelous (PSMS Medan)

18 goals
 Cristian Gonzáles (Persisam Putra Samarinda)
 Hilton Moreira (Sriwijaya)

17 goals
 Aldo Barreto (Persiba Balikpapan)

16 goals

 Bambang Pamungkas (Persija Jakarta)
 Pedro Velázquez (Persija Jakarta)
 Dzumafo Herman Epandi (PSPS Pekanbaru/Arema Indonesia)

15 goals

 Marcio Souza (Arema Indonesia/Persib Bandung)
 Gaston Castano (Gresik United)
 Yohanes Pahabol (Persidafon Dafonsoro)
 Jean Paul Boumsong (Persiram Raja Ampat)

14 goals
 Patrich Wanggai (Persidafon Dafonsoro)

13 goals

 Jajang Mulyana (Mitra Kukar)
 Kenji Adachihara (Persiba Balikpapan)
 Lewis Weeks (Persiwa Wamena)

12 goals
 Camara Sekou (PSAP Sigli)

11 goals
 Miljan Radovic (Persib Bandung)

10 goals
 Aleksandar Bajevski (Pelita Jaya)

9 goals

 Gustavo Lopez (Persela Lamongan)
 Pieter Rumaropen (Persiwa Wamena)
 Zaenal Arif (PSPS Pekanbaru)

8 goals
 Zah Rahan (Persipura Jayapura)
 Muhammad Ridwan (Sriwijaya)

7 goals

 James Koko Lomell (Gresik United/Deltras)
 Marwan Sayedeh (Gresik United)
 Zulham Zamrun (Mitra Kukar)
 Shohei Matsunaga (Persiba Balikpapan)
 Boaz Solossa (Persipura Jayapura)
 Boima Karpeh (Persisam Putra Samarinda)
 Jaelaniu Arey (Persiwa Wamena)
 Yoo Wook-Jin (PSAP Sigli/Persiram Raja Ampat)
 Patrice Nzekou (PSPS Pekanbaru)

6 goals

 Muhammad Fakhrudin (Deltras)
 Qischil G. Minny (Deltras)
 Nemanja Obrić (Mitra Kukar)
 John Tarkpor (Pelita Jaya)
 Atep (Persib Bandung)
 Eduard Ivakdalam (Persidafon Dafonsoro)
 Rahmat Affandi (Persija Jakarta)
 Elthon Maran (Persiram Raja Ampat)

5 goals

 Arif Ariyanto (Arema Indonesia)
 Seme Pattrick (Arema Indonesia)
 Victor Igbonefo (Pelita Jaya)
 Jimmy Suparno (Persela Lamongan)
 Airlangga Sucipto (Persib Bandung)
 Asri Akbar (Persiba Balikpapan)
 Sultan Samma (Persiba Balikpapan)
 Bio Paulin (Persipura Jayapura)
 Yoseph Ostanika (PSMS Medan)
 Firman Utina (Sriwijaya)
 Siswanto (Sriwijaya)
 Thierry Gathuessi (Sriwijaya)

4 goals

 Muhammad Ridhuan (Arema Indonesia)
 Sean Rooney (Deltras)
 Esteban José Herrera (Mitra Kukar)
 Marcus Bent (Mitra Kukar)
 Saktiawan Sinaga (Mitra Kukar)
 Joko Sasongko (Pelita Jaya)
 Gery Setia (Persela Lamongan)
 Roman Golian (Persela Lamongan)
 Noh Alam Shah (Persib Bandung)
 Ahmad Sembiring (Persiba Balikpapan)
 Lukas Rumkabu (Persidafon Dafonsoro)
 Marcelo Cirelli (Persidafon Dafonsoro)
 Fabiano Beltrame (Persija Jakarta)
 Ramdani Lestaluhu (Persija Jakarta)
 Ian Louis Kabes (Persipura Jayapura)
 Lukas Mandowen (Persipura Jayapura)
 Eka Ramdani (Persisam Putra Samarinda)
 Srđan Lopičić (Persisam Putra Samarinda)
 Yongki Aribowo (Persisam Putra Samarinda)
 Abu Bakar Bah (PSAP Sigli)
 Luis Alejandro Peña (PSMS Medan)
 Zulkarnain (PSMS Medan)
 April Hadi (PSPS Pekanbaru)
 Muhammad Isnaini (PSPS Pekanbaru)

3 goals

 Alain N'Kong (Arema Indonesia)
 Feri Aman Saragih (Arema Indonesia)
 Lacine Kone (Deltras)
 Gustavo Chena (Gresik United)
 Uston Nawawi (Gresik United)
 Ahmad Bustomi (Mitra Kukar)
 Hamka Hamzah (Mitra Kukar)
 Lee Sang-Min (Mitra Kukar)
 Jajang Sukmara (Persib Bandung)
 Maman Abdurahman (Persib Bandung)
 Moses Sakyi (Persib Bandung)
 Muhammad Ilham (Persib Bandung)
 Rachmat Latief (Persiba Balikpapan)
 Rasmoyo (Persidafon Dafonsoro)
 Robertino Pugliara (Persija Jakarta)
 Titus Bonai (Persipura Jayapura)
 Yustinus Pae (Persipura Jayapura)
 Anderson da Silva (Persiram Raja Ampat)
 Oktavianus Maniani (Persiram Raja Ampat)
 Sayuti (PSAP Sigli)
 Nastja Čeh (PSMS Medan)

2 goals

 Dicky Firasat (Arema Indonesia)
 Sunarto (Arema Indonesia)
 Ahmad Maulana Putra (Deltras)
 Amos Marah (Deltras)
 Budi Sudarsono (Deltras)
 Anindito Wahyu Erminarno (Mitra Kukar)
 Gustave Bahoken (Mitra Kukar)
 Pierre Njanka (Mitra Kukar/Persisam Putra Samarinda)
 Stanislav Zhekov (Pelita Jaya)
 Irsyad Aras (Persela Lamongan)
 Park Chul-Hyung (Persela Lamongan)
 Taufiq Kasrun (Persela Lamongan)
 Zaenal Arifin (Persela Lamongan)
 Aliyudin Ali (Persib Bandung)
 Esteban Guillén (Persiba Balikpapan)
 Christian Warobay (Persidafon Dafonsoro)
 Eric Bayemi (Persidafon Dafonsoro)
 Izak Ogoai (Persidafon Dafonsoro)
 Gideon V. Way (Persiram Raja Ampat)
 Nasution Karubaba (Persiram Raja Ampat)
 Tomoyuki Sakai (Persiram Raja Ampat)
 Yan D. Ruatakurey (Persiram Raja Ampat)
 Johan Yoga Utama (Persisam Putra Samarinda)
 Firly Apriansyah (Persiwa Wamena)
 Yuichi Shibakoya (Persiwa Wamena)
 Abdul Faisal (PSAP Sigli)
 Lee Soung Yong (PSAP Sigli)
 Sukman Suaib (PSAP Sigli)
 Arie Supriyatna (PSMS Medan)
 Denny Rumba (PSMS Medan)
 Saša Zečević (PSMS Medan)
 Agus Cima (PSPS Pekanbaru)
 Michael Orah (PSPS Pekanbaru)
 Achmad Jufriyanto (Sriwijaya)
 Nova Arianto (Sriwijaya)
 Riski Novriansyah (Sriwijaya)

1 goal

 Agung Suprayogi (Arema Indonesia)
 Dendi Santoso (Arema Indonesia)
 Firmansyah Aprillianto (Arema Indonesia)
 Johan Ahmad Farizi (Arema Indonesia)
 Kusnul Yuli (Arema Indonesia)
 Juan Revi (Deltras)
 Mijo Dadić (Deltras)
 Shin Hyun-Joon (Deltras)
 Supandi (Deltras)
 Walter Brizuela (Deltras)
 David Faristian (Gresik United)
 Ponsianus Mayona Amtop (Gresik United)
 Rahmat Rivai (Gresik United)
 Rudianto (Gresik United)
 Arif Suyono (Mitra Kukar)
 Fadil Sausu (Mitra Kukar)
 Isnan Ali (Mitra Kukar)
 Seiji Kaneko (Mitra Kukar)
 Victor Simon Badawi (Mitra Kukar)
 Engelbert Sani (Pelita Jaya)
 Aris Alfiansyah (Persela Lamongan)
 Dedi Indra (Persela Lamongan)
 Fathlul Rahman (Persela Lamongan)
 Oh In-Kyun (Persela Lamongan)
 Rudi Widodo (Persela Lamongan)
 Abanda Herman (Persib Bandung)
 Budiawan (Persib Bandung)
 Eki Nurhakim (Persiba Balikpapan)
 Supriyadi (Persiba Balikpapan)
 Syaiful Lewenussa (Persiba Balikpapan)
 Tomislav Labudović (Persiba Balikpapan)
 Alan Aronggear (Persidafon Dafonsoro)
 Andri Ibo (Persidafon Dafonsoro)
 Izaac Wanggai (Persidafon Dafonsoro)
 Mitchell Nere (Persidafon Dafonsoro)
 Zico Rumkabu (Persidafon Dafonsoro)
 Ismed Sofyan (Persija Jakarta)
 Johan Juansyah (Persija Jakarta)
 Octavianus (Persija Jakarta)
 Precious Emuejeraye (Persija Jakarta)
 David Laly (Persipura Jayapura)
 Gerald Pangkali (Persipura Jayapura)
 Imanuel Wanggai (Persipura Jayapura)
 Yohanis Tjoe (Persipura Jayapura)
 Kubay Quaiyan (Persiram Raja Ampat)
 Marthen Tao (Persiram Raja Ampat)
 Nehemia Solossa (Persiram Raja Ampat)
 Steven Hendambo (Persiram Raja Ampat)
 Fajar Legian Siswanto (Persisam Putra Samarinda)
 Kim Dong-Chan (Persisam Putra Samarinda)
 Luc Zoa (Persisam Putra Samarinda)
 Fred Mote (Persiwa Wamena)
 Galih Firmansyah (Persiwa Wamena)
 Ricardo Merani (Persiwa Wamena)
 Yesaya Desnam (Persiwa Wamena)
 Feri Komul (PSAP Sigli)
 Heri Saputra (PSAP Sigli)
 Mfundo Cecil (PSAP Sigli)
 Reza Fandi (PSAP Sigli)
 Alamsyah Nasution (PSMS Medan)
 Novi Handriawan (PSMS Medan)
 Ade Suhendra (PSPS Pekanbaru)
 M. Zahrul Azhar (PSPS Pekanbaru)
 Ponaryo Astaman (Sriwijaya)
 Supardi Nasir (Sriwijaya)

Own goal
1 goal
 Dedi Gusmawan (PSPS Pekanbaru) (for Persela Lamongan)
 Hamka Hamzah (Mitra Kukar) (for Persisam Putra Samarinda)
 Jajang Sukmara (Persib Bandung) (for Persipura Jayapura)
 Kubay Quaiyan (Persiram Raja Ampat) (for Persib Bandung)
 Luc Zoa (Persisam Putra Samarinda) (for Deltras)
 Precious Emuejeraye (Persija Jakarta) (for Arema Indonesia)
 Rahmad (PSMS Medan) (for Arema Indonesia)

References

External links
 Official website

goalscorers